History of the World, Part II is an American sketch comedy limited series, which debuted in March 2023 on Hulu. Written and produced by Mel Brooks, Wanda Sykes, Nick Kroll, Ike Barinholtz, and David Stassen, the series serves as a sequel to the 1981 film written and directed by Brooks, with sketches parodying events from different periods of human history and legend.

Cast 
The cast features a large ensemble, including a core of several regulars who are also among the series writers:

Main
 Mel Brooks as Narrator
 Wanda Sykes as various characters (including Harriet Tubman, Bessie Coleman, and Shirley Chisholm)
 Nick Kroll as various characters (including Schmuck Mudman, Judas, Galileo, Henry Kissinger, and Japheth)
 Ike Barinholtz as various characters (including Ulysses S. Grant, Alexander Graham Bell, and Leon Trotsky)

Recurring
 
 Jason "Wee Man" Acuña as Russian 
 Pamela Adlon as Fanny Mudman 
 James Adomian as President Richard Nixon
 Jason Alexander as Notary 
 Fred Armisen as Glorp
 Tim Baltz as Lt. Henry Honeybeard 
 Malcolm Barrett as Captain Hanks 
 Zazie Beetz as Mary Magdalene 
 Jack Black as Joseph Stalin 
 Edgar Blackmon as Private Johnson
 Guy Branum as Serf Board Vendor 
 Owen Burke as Boris / Red Sox Fan
 Josh Gad as William Shakespeare
 Dove Cameron as Anastasia Romanov 
 Danny DeVito as Csar Nicolas Romanov
 Ronny Chieng as Kublai Khan 
 Rob Corddry as Vladimir Lenin 
 Jon Daly as Glenn 
 Colton Dunn as Conrad Chisholm 
 Jay Ellis as Jesus 
 Josh Fadem as Private Bryant 
 Marla Gibbs as Ruby Seale
 Mitra Jouhari as various characters 
 Johnny Knoxville as Rasputin 
 Richard Kind as Saint Peter 
 Preston Lacy as Russian Noble 
 Scott MacArthur as WV Man 
 Zahn McClarnon as Mingoes 
 Charles Melton as Joshy Mudman 
 Seth Morris as Freud Patient / Shakespeare Writer 
 Brock O'Hurn as White Swole Jesus
 Gil Ozeri as Zakher 
 Chris Pontius as Russian Assassin 
 Nick Robinson as Robert Todd Lincoln 
 Seth Rogen as Noah
 J. B. Smoove as Luke 
 David Stassen as Sitcom Director / Union Soldier
 Drew Tarver as Adolf Hitler / Private Tully 
 George Wallace as George Wallace
 Kym Whitley as Florynce Kennedy 
 Tyler James Williams as Mason Dixon

Episodes

Production 
Despite the numeration History of the World, Part I, there were no plans for a sequel to the 1981 film. The title was a play on The History of the World by Sir Walter Raleigh, which was intended to be published in several volumes but only the first was completed.

However, in October 2021, Hulu and Searchlight Television announced the Part II sequel series was in the works, with production beginning in spring 2022. Mel Brooks would produce and write the series along with Wanda Sykes, Ike Barinholtz, and Nick Kroll, who would also appear.

Release 
The first two episodes premiered on March 6, 2023, in the United States, with the remaining episodes released over the following three days. It was also released on Disney+ internationally as a Star Original and Star+ in Latin America on the same day.

Reception

References

External links

2023 American television series debuts
2023 American television series endings
Television series created by Mel Brooks
Television series by 20th Century Fox Television
Television series by Searchlight Television
English-language television shows
Hulu original programming
2020s American sketch comedy television series